The 2012 Karshi Challenger was a professional tennis tournament played on hard courts. It was the sixth edition of the tournament which was part of the 2012 ATP Challenger Tour. It took place in Qarshi, Uzbekistan between 13 and 19 August 2012.

Singles main-draw entrants

Seeds

 1 Rankings are as of August 6, 2012.

Other entrants
The following players received wildcards into the singles main draw:
  Sarvar Ikramov
  Temur Ismailov
  Sergey Shipilov
  Nigmat Shofayziev

The following players received entry from the qualifying draw:
  Sriram Balaji
  Denis Matsukevich
  Adrian Sikora
  Dzmitry Zhyrmont

Champions

Singles

 Igor Kunitsyn def.  Dzmitry Zhyrmont, 7–6(12–10), 6–2

Doubles

 Hsin-han Lee /  Peng Hsien-Yin def.  Brydan Klein /  Yasutaka Uchiyama 6–7(5–7), 6–4, [10–4]

External links
Official Website

Karshi Challenger
Karshi Challenger